José Paulo Rubim (born 26 July 1946) is a Brazilian football manager. In 2010 he was named head coach of Benin. He left this position later the same year.

Managerial statistics

References

1946 births
Living people
Expatriate football managers in Liberia
Brazilian expatriate sportspeople in China
Expatriate football managers in China
Brazilian expatriate sportspeople in Portugal
Expatriate football managers in Portugal
Brazilian expatriate sportspeople in Tunisia
Expatriate football managers in Tunisia
Brazilian expatriate sportspeople in Saudi Arabia
Expatriate football managers in Saudi Arabia
Brazilian expatriate sportspeople in the United Arab Emirates
Expatriate football managers in the United Arab Emirates
Brazilian expatriate sportspeople in Qatar
Expatriate football managers in Qatar
Brazilian expatriate sportspeople in Algeria
Expatriate football managers in Algeria
Expatriate football managers in Benin
Brazilian football managers
CS Sfaxien managers
Club Athlétique Bizertin managers
Étoile Sportive du Sahel managers
Stade Tunisien managers
USM Blida managers
Tunisian Ligue Professionnelle 1 players
Algerian Ligue Professionnelle 1 players
Association footballers not categorized by position
Association football players not categorized by nationality
Footballers from Rio de Janeiro (city)